Georgia State Route 45 Truck may refer to:

Georgia State Route 45 Truck (Arlington): A truck route in Arlington
Georgia State Route 45 Truck (Colquitt): A truck route in Colquitt

045 Truck